TUG1 (taurine upregulated gene 1) is a long non-coding RNA expressed in the retina and in the brain. It was first identified in a screen for genes upregulated by in developing retinal cells in response to taurine. It is required for the normal development of photoreceptors in the retina.

See also
 Long noncoding RNA

References

Further reading

Non-coding RNA